Arline Pretty (September 5, 1885 – April 14, 1978) was an American film actress of the silent era.

Life and career 
Pretty was born September 5, 1893, in Philadelphia, Pennsylvania. Her mother was a musician.

For three years, Pretty acted on stage in Washington, D. C., with the Columbia Stock Company before debuting in films in 1913. 

Her early film experience was as a supporting actress for King Baggot at Universal. After that, she acted for the Vitagraph Company in leading ingenue parts. She appeared as the daughter of a jailer with Douglas Fairbanks in In Again, Out Again.

Pretty's film work included the Vitagraph serial The Secret Kingdom (1917),

Selected filmography
 One Best Bet (1914)
 The Surprises of an Empty Hotel (1916)
 In Again, Out Again (1917)
 A Woman in Grey (1920)
 Life (1920)
 The Valley of Doubt (1920)
 When the Devil Drives (1922)
 Love in the Dark (1922)
 Stormswept (1923)
 The White Flower (1923)
 Bucking the Barrier (1923)
 Tipped Off (1923)
 Rouged Lips (1923)
 A Fool's Awakening (1924)
 Barriers Burned Away (1925)
 The Girl on the Stairs (1925)
 The Primrose Path (1925)
 Virgin Lips (1928)
 Shipmates Forever (1935)

References

Bibliography
 Munden, Kenneth White. The American Film Institute Catalog of Motion Pictures Produced in the United States, Part 1. University of California Press, 1997.

External links

1885 births
1978 deaths
American film actresses
American silent film actresses
20th-century American actresses
People from Washington, D.C.
American stage actresses
Film serial actresses